Crawl Space is a 1977 album by American flugelhornist Art Farmer  released on the CTI label.

Reception
The Allmusic review stated "The moody music holds one's interest throughout".

Track listing
 "Crawl Space" (Dave Grusin) -  8:52   
 "Siddhartha" (Fritz Pauer) - 7:36   
 "Chanson" (Grusin) - 8:36   
 "Petite Belle" (Art Farmer) - 9:41   
Recorded at Van Gelder Studio in Englewood Cliffs, New Jersey in January 1977

Personnel
Art Farmer - flugelhorn
Jeremy Steig - flute
David Grusin - keyboards, arranger (tracks 1 & 3)
Eric Gale - guitar
Will Lee - electric bass, gong
George Mraz - bass (track 2)
Steve Gadd - drums
Fritz Pauer  - arranger (tracks 2 & 4)
Bob James - conductor, producer
Creed Taylor - producer

References

CTI Records albums
Art Farmer albums
1977 albums
Albums produced by Creed Taylor
Albums recorded at Van Gelder Studio